Cañada de Gómez is a city in the . It has a population of about 29,000 inhabitants.

The town was founded in 1869 by Guillermo Perkins, and became a city on 7 October 1922.

References

 
 

Populated places in Santa Fe Province
Cities in Argentina
Argentina
Santa Fe Province